Kim Yoo-rim (Hangul: 김유림, sometimes rendered Kim Yu-rim or Kim Yu-lim; born 3 February 1990) is a South Korean speed skater. She competed at the 2006 Winter Olympics in Torino, women's speed skating 500 m and 100 m. She finished in 20th position at the 500 m, 28th at the 1000 m. She competed in the 1000 m at the 2010 Winter Olympics in Vancouver, but she did not finish the race.

External links
Olympic statistics

Living people
1990 births
South Korean female speed skaters
Olympic speed skaters of South Korea
Speed skaters at the 2006 Winter Olympics
Speed skaters at the 2010 Winter Olympics
Asian Games medalists in speed skating
Speed skaters at the 2007 Asian Winter Games
Asian Games bronze medalists for South Korea
Medalists at the 2007 Asian Winter Games
21st-century South Korean women